Entrecasteaux is a commune in the Var department in Provence-Alpes-Côte d'Azur region in southeastern France.

It is noted for its public square designed by Le Nôtre, and its seventeenth-century Château, restored by Scottish artist Ian MacGarvie-Munn.

Geography

Climate

Entrecasteaux has a hot-summer Mediterranean climate (Köppen climate classification Csa).

See also
Communes of the Var department

References

Communes of Var (department)
French Riviera